Second-seeded Helen Jacobs defeated first-seeded Helen Wills Moody 8–6, 3–6, 3–0 ret. in the final to win the 'Women's Singles tennis title at the 1933 U.S. National Championships at the Forest Hills Tennis Stadium in Queens. At 0–3 in the final set Wills Moody retired citing a back injury. The loss ended Wills Moody's 45-match winning streak at the U.S. Championships. The final was played on August 26, 1933, in front of a crowd of 8,000 spectators.

Seeds
The tournament used two lists of six players for seeding the women's singles event; one for U.S. players and one for foreign players. Helen Jacobs is the champion; others show in brackets the round in which they were eliminated.

  Helen Wills Moody (finalist, retired)
  Helen Jacobs (champion)
  Alice Marble (quarterfinals)
  Sarah Palfrey (quarterfinals)
  Carolin Babcock
  Josephine Cruickshank (quarterfinals)

  Dorothy Round (semifinals)
  Betty Nuthall (semifinals)
  Mary Heeley (quarterfinals)
  Peggy Scriven
  Joan Ridley
  Freda James

Draw

Final eight

References

1933
1933 in women's tennis
1933 in American women's sports
Women's Singles